Botryllocarpa is a genus of ascidian tunicates in the family Styelidae.

Species within the genus Botryllocarpa include:
 Botryllocarpa elongata Kott, 1990 
 Botryllocarpa viridis (Pizon, 1908)

References

Stolidobranchia
Tunicate genera